Paul Okatwa Odhiambo is a former Kenyan striker  who until recently was the head coach at Kenyan National Super League side Kangemi AllStars.

Okwatwa was often referred to as a journeyman having turned out for eleven Kenyan Premier League clubs between the years 2010 and 2019. The list includes A.F.C. Leopards, Oserian F.C.,Posta Rangers, Kakamega Homeboyz, Gor Mahia F.C.,Western Stima, Ushuru F.C., Muhoroni Youth F.C., Sofapaka, Tusker F.C. and Mt. Kenya United.

Career
Okatwa started his top-flight journey as a teenager at A.F.C. Leopards but after two of three seasons was released. At the start of the 2012 season, Okatwa moved to Naivasha-based Oserian F.C. where he lasted six months before joining Posta Rangers for the rest of the year. 

At the beginning of the 2013 season, Okatwa moved to the newly promoted premiership side Kakamega Homeboyz but mid-season he was back in Nairobi to join Gor Mahia F.C. For the 2014 season, he was sent to Western Stima
 on a season-long deal. 

In 2015 he joined Ushuru F.C. but quit after a less than three months. In June he switched to Muhoroni Youth for the remainder of the season. He was released by the club in March of 2016 with three months left on his contract.

He joined Sofapaka in June 2016 and after a year he joined Tusker F.C. in June of 2017  on a three-year deal. In June of 2018, Okwatwa returned to Posta Rangers after six years on a three-year deal but only lasted five months till November of that year. He then opted to join his final top flight work station Nakumatt FC. 

After years in the Premier League, Okatwa stepped down to join Nairobi City Stars in the second-tier in April 2019 for a two-month stint till the end of the 2018-19 season. Thereafter, and after some time out due to injury, he joined another second tier side FC Talanta in 2020. 

In July 2021, he started his coaching journey after joining relegation-threatened Kangemi All-Stars while in the Kenyan third tier league.

References

External links

Paul Okatwa Odhiambo at Faso Talents

Living people
1992 births
Kenyan footballers
Football managers in Kenya
Nairobi City Stars players
A.F.C. Leopards players
Gor Mahia F.C. players
Mt Kenya United F.C. players
Muhoroni Youth F.C. players
Sofapaka F.C. players
Tusker F.C. players
Ushuru F.C. players
Oserian F.C. players
Posta Rangers F.C. players
Kakamega Homeboyz F.C. players
Western Stima F.C. players